The Gender Park, established in 2013, is an initiative of the Government of Kerala to work towards gender equality and empowerment in the state. It is headquartered in the state’s capital, Thiruvananthapuram. Its main 24-acre campus is set at Silver Hills, Kozhikode (Calicut). With a key focus on gender justice, it is a platform for policy analysis, research, advocacy, capacity development, economic and social initiative. It found standing under the Department of Social Justice and is the first space of its kind in the world. Currently working under the Department of Women and Child Development, it aims to become a premier convergence point for gender-related activities. Recently, UN Women and The Gender Park have entered into an equal partnership to develop the Park as a South Asian hub for gender equality.

The founding CEO of The Gender Park is Dr PTM Mohammed Sunish. In 2021, T. V. Anupama IAS had additional charge as the CEO of the organization, along with her position as the Director of Women and Child Development. In September 2021, Adeela Abdulla IAS has been appointed as the CEO of The Gender Park, in addition to her new role as the Director of Women and Child Development.

Aim
The Gender Park works towards creating relevant interventions that help address a range of gender-based issues. These involve both off-campus as well as on-campus activities and include various projects that work towards empowering individuals and communities by adopting a gender lens while designing interventions. 
 
It aims to specifically increase state capacity and efficiency by providing reports, evaluations and recommendations on government action in the realm of gender justice. As a registered society under the Department of Women and Child Development, it is uniquely positioned to see that these recommendations are implemented by the government.

Initiatives

International Conference on Gender Equality (ICGE)
The International Conference on Gender Equality (ICGE), conducted by The Gender Park, is a series of conferences that provide an international platform for discussing pressing issues related to gender equality and for raising awareness. The Conference invites some of the sharpest minds to share the stage and deliberate on academic as well as development challenges around gender equality.

The Gender Park hosted the first conferences (ICGE- I) in association with UN Women and supported by UNFPA in November 2015. ICGE-I focussed on Gender, Governance, and Inclusion. Issues of inclusion were discussed intensely at the workshop, where the Government of Kerala also launched the State Government Policy for Transgenders (2015). The policy launch was followed by a panel where individuals from the trans community shared the relevance of the policy in their lives.  A Conference Statement was issued and disseminated globally.

The second ICGE – ICGE II on ‘Gender in Sustainable Entrepreneurship and Social Business: The Mediating Role of Empowerment’ was held on February 11, 12 and 13, 2021, at The Gender Park Campus, Kozhikode. ICGE II was organized in partnership with UN Women. The global meet had eight plenary sessions and nine parallel sessions. The three-day conference was organized strictly abiding by the COVID-19 safety protocol. Over 90 speakers from 20 countries attended the conference physically and remotely. The conference achieved carbon neutrality and became the first carbon-neutral event in Kerala.

International Institute for Gender and Development (IIGD)- WiSE Fellowship
The research and learning component of The Gender Park, the IIGD aims to be devoted to multidisciplinary research, theorization, and policy interventions. Its mission is to conduct high-quality research and effective capacity development to provide innovative yet feasible recommendations for policymakers. Apart from educating students in gender theory and practice, IIGD’s larger goal is to foster just and inclusive societies for all.

IIGD has envisaged the Women in Sustainable Entrepreneurship (WiSE) Fellowship programme in partnership with national and international universities which will take off in 2021. WiSE is a platform for budding women entrepreneurs to find necessary support and scale up their ventures.

The idea is to provide the aforementioned entrepreneurs with support from Fellows who will be given rigorous training in all aspects of taking sustainable projects through different stages- including bureaucratic, business processes, creative thinking, customer acquisition etc.

International Women’s Trade Centre (iWTC)
International Women’s Trade Centre (iWTC) is an ambitious initiative and will be a first-of-its-kind trade centre that caters to the specific needs of women in business. The project is The Gender Park’s commitment towards creating a safe and sustainable environment for the growth of the industry, business, trade, lifestyle, and a cultural centre for women.

iWTC envisages to become a one-stop retail and business support centre, to hand-hold and encourage women in the business ensuring that their economic, social and health needs are met, for their overall development.

Gender Library
The state-of-the-art Gender Library in the Gender Park campus aims to support enhanced scholarship in gender and development through effective knowledge management. It will be a repository for collecting, creating and disseminating local, national, and global knowledge on gender.

The library will be a central point of reference for literature on various subjects covering gender, sexuality and feminist perspectives to provide improved access to such material.

Heritage Museum
The Heritage Museum is an initiative to showcase a journey about women's history and will function as an archive to put gender history in perspective. It will focus on the history of Kerala’s resilient women, their lived experiences and how much they have contributed to the larger discourse on women’s rights.

She Taxi
She Taxi is a primary off-campus initiative, is an internationally acclaimed, ongoing project that focuses on the economic empowerment of women. It is the first of its kind model in India, where women are the owners and drivers of their vehicles. The project broke into the unconventional markets of driving, molding them into becoming entrepreneurs to financially support themselves. The service not only envisioned livelihoods for these women but also provided security to the scores of female travelers in Kerala. Additionally, these women entrepreneurs manage the operations through the She Taxi Federation supported by a fleet operator.   
 
It has since won several accolades across the globe, including a special mention at the South Asian Study Tour in Gender in Transport, by the World Bank, in Vietnam, and the Chief Minister’s Award for Innovation in Public Policy in 2014.

She Taxi was relaunched on May 11, 2020 with the service opening for a larger audience - a women-for-all initiative. The service has been extended to all 14 districts of Kerala.

COVID-19 support
During the lockdown of COVID-19 pandemic, the women of She Taxi provided their service to the elderly citizens who were in need of medicines or had to commute to the hospital. It was provided free of cost to the BPL citizens and at a half rate to others. Measures like SMS (Sanitizer, Mask and Social distancing) are ensured, keeping in mind the COVID-19 situation.

References

Gender equality
Women and education
Feminism in India
Women's studies
State agencies of Kerala
Government agencies established in 2013
2013 establishments in Kerala